Henry Chance Newton (13 March 1854 – 2 January 1931) was a British author and theatre critic for The Referee magazine.

Newton had written about the stage since 1875 when he joined the staff of Hood's Comic Annual. He wrote using the pseudonym Gawain, the London correspondent, for the New York Dramatic Mirror, and as Carados for The Referee.

Newton, in conjunction with Richard Butler, wrote libretti for musical comedy under the joint collaborative name of Richard Henry. Works attributed to Richard Henry include Monte Cristo Jr. (burlesque melodrama 1886); Jubilation (musical mixture 1887); Frankenstein, or The Vampire's Victim, a parody of the Mary Shelley novel Frankenstein, presented at the Gaiety Theatre, London, in 1887; and Opposition (a debate in one sitting 1892).

Publications
Henry Chance Newton, History of "Ye George and Vulture Tavern" (1909)
Henry Chance Newton, The Old Vic. and Its Associations: Being My Own Extraordinary Experiences of "Queen Wictoria's Own Theayter" (1923)
Henry Chance Newton, Idols of the "Halls": being my Music Hall Memories

References

External links 
 Plays by Henry Chance Newton on Great War Theatre

1854 births
1931 deaths
20th-century British dramatists and playwrights
19th-century British dramatists and playwrights